Torcinello (turcenélle in the Apulian and Molise dialects, mboti, turcinieddi, or turcinieddhri in the Salento dialect) is an Italian dish from Apulia and Molise consisting of lamb intestines wrapped around lamb liver or offal, typically testicles. It is generally grilled, but may also be stewed.

See also
 Kokoretsi
 Gardoubakia
 Zarajos, a similar dish from Manchego cuisine, especially in the Cuenca area.

References

Italian cuisine
Offal